The Last Mile is a 1959 American drama film directed by Howard W. Koch starring Mickey Rooney. The film is a remake of a 1932 film of the same name starring Preston Foster.

Plot
In a death row cell block nine inmates are scheduled for execution. Then "Killer" John Mears (Rooney) comes along. His viciousness infects the environment and his plans to break out of prison are the catalyst for tragedy.

Cast
 Mickey Rooney as "Killer" John Mears, Cell 3	 
 Frank Overton as Father O'Connors	 
 Michael Constantine as Ed Werner, Cell 1	 
 John Vari as Jimmy Martin, Cell 2	 
 Clifford David as Richard Walters, Cell 4	 
 Harry Millard as Fred Mayor, Cell 5	 
 John McCurry as Vince Jackson, Cell 6	 
 Ford Rainey as Red Kirby, Cell 7	 
 John Seven as Tom D'Amoro, Cell 8	 
 George Marcy as Pete Rodriguez, Cell 2 (later) 
 Donald Barry as Drake	 
 Leon Janney as Callahan	 
 Clifton James as Harris	 
 Milton Selzer as Peddie	 
 Frank Conroy as O'Flaherty
 Alan Bunce as Warden Stone

See also
 List of American films of 1959

References

External links
 
 
 
 

1959 films
1959 drama films
American drama films
Remakes of American films
American prison films
Film noir
Films about capital punishment
Films directed by Howard W. Koch
American films based on plays
United Artists films
1950s English-language films
1950s American films